The 1993 Northeast Louisiana Indians football team was an American football team that represented Northeast Louisiana University (now known as the University of Louisiana at Monroe) as part of the Southland Conference during the 1993 NCAA Division I-AA football season. In their fifth year under head coach Dave Roberts, the team compiled a 9–3 record. The Indians offense scored 462 points while the defense allowed 275 points.

Schedule

References

Northeast Louisiana
Louisiana–Monroe Warhawks football seasons
Northeast Louisiana Indians football